Cheikh Tidiane Sabaly (born 4 March 1999) is a Senegalese professional footballer who plays as a forward for Ligue 2 club Metz.

Career 
Sabaly made his Ligue 1 debut for Metz on 30 August 2020 in a 1–0 home defeat against Monaco.

On 24 January 2022, Sabaly joined Quevilly-Rouen on loan until the end of the season.

References

External links

1999 births
Living people
Senegalese footballers
Association football forwards
People from Kolda Region
Génération Foot players
FC Metz players
Pau FC players
US Quevilly-Rouen Métropole players
Ligue 2 players
Championnat National players
Ligue 1 players
Championnat National 2 players